"Zanzibar" is the first episode of the fourth series of the British black comedy anthology television programme Inside No. 9. Written by Steve Pemberton and Reece Shearsmith, the episode was directed by David Kerr and was first shown on 2 January 2018, on BBC Two. It stars Pemberton, Shearsmith, Rory Kinnear, Bill Paterson, Marcia Warren, Hattie Morahan, Kevin Eldon, Tanya Franks, Helen Monks and Jaygann Ayeh. The episode is told through the style of iambic pentameter.

It received positive reviews from critics.

References

External links

"Zanzibar" at BBC Programmes
"Zanzibar" at the British Comedy Guide

2018 British television episodes
Inside No. 9 episodes